Jeff Harding (born 5 February 1965 in Sydney) is a retired world champion boxer from Australia, known as "Hit Man". Harding lived in South Grafton N.S.W. Australia and was a student at South Grafton High School. He trained with Steve Cansdell in Grafton before relocating to Sydney where he was first trained by John Lewis at the Newtown Police Boys' Club from where he won his first amateur title (NSW State). Harding was the 2004 Inductee for the Australian National Boxing Hall of Fame Moderns category.

Professional career
Harding was a rugged come forward type fighter turned professional in 1986 and in 1989 won the WBC Light Heavyweight Title with a 12th-round TKO over Dennis Andries in only his 15th professional fight with Johnny Lewis in his corner. He defended the title twice before losing the belt via KO in 1990 in a rematch with Andries. In 1991 he recaptured the WBC Light Heavyweight Title by taking a majority decision over Andries in their third match. He defended the belt twice before losing the title in 1994 to Mike McCallum by unanimous decision. Harding retired after the bout.

Professional boxing record

External links

1965 births
Living people
Boxers at the 1986 Commonwealth Games
Commonwealth Games silver medallists for Australia
World light-heavyweight boxing champions
World boxing champions
Sportsmen from New South Wales
Boxers from Sydney
World Boxing Council champions
Australian male boxers
Commonwealth Games medallists in boxing
Medallists at the 1986 Commonwealth Games